Almond Gaston “A. G.” Crowe Jr. is a former Republican Louisiana State Senator born May 8, 1948 in New Orleans.

Political history
Crowe resides in Pearl River, Louisiana. He represented Louisiana State Senate District 1 (parts of Orleans, Plaquemines, Saint Bernard, and Saint Tammany parishes) between 2008 and 2016. In 2007, he defeated the then-incumbent and then-Democrat Kenneth L. Odinet. He previously represented District 76 in the Louisiana House of Representatives between 2000 and 2008. He had unsuccessfully sought to represent Louisiana Senate District 12 in 1998. Crowe was previously an elected member of the Saint Tammany Parish School Board.

Education and business career
After finishing Francis T. Nicholls High School in New Orleans, Crowe obtained his bachelor’s degree in business administration from Southeastern Louisiana University.  He has worked in sales for CaseCraft Manufacturing, Gillette-PaperMate, and Pentel. In 1982 he founded his own company, Saint Tammany Office Products (STOP), which in 1991 became the Northshore vendor for Xerox. In 2002 Crowe expanded his operation as a new company called The File Depot which has since moved beyond Saint Tammany Parish.  He later started Shop Local USA, LLC with the primary mission of encouraging people to shop and support local businesses.

Legislative activities
In the Senate, Crowe is vice chair of the Standing Committee on Commerce, Consumer Protection, and International Affairs. He serves or has served on other standing and ad hoc committees, several of which are involved with Katrina relief.  Crowe is also highly networked into a variety of community organizations and belongs to Ducks Unlimited, Louisiana Wildlife Association, and National Rifle Association. He is a self-professed conservative. He has won numerous accolades as a legislator including being chosen the 2002 “Legislator of the Year” by the Alliance for Good Government, a bipartisan Louisiana organization which presses for honesty and integrity in public office.

Personal life
Crowe is married to Linda McCoin Crowe, a kindergarten teacher from Bogalusa, Louisiana. The couple has two children and seven grandchildren. He is an ordained Deacon at First Baptist Church, an affiliate of the Southern Baptist Convention. A.G. Crowe is a Rotarian and 2 time Paul Harris Fellow.

Notes

1948 births
Living people
Baptists from Louisiana
Republican Party Louisiana state senators
People from St. Tammany Parish, Louisiana
Southeastern Louisiana University alumni